Azri'el is a religious moshav in central Israel. Located near Tel Mond, it falls under the jurisdiction of Lev HaSharon Regional Council.

History
Moshav Azriel was founded in 1951 by immigrants from Yemen. The moshav is named after Azriel Hildesheimer, a founder of Modern Orthodox Judaism.

In 2006, the moshav approved an expansion plan to bring in new families. Twenty families moved in by the summer of 2008.

References

Moshavim
Religious Israeli communities
Populated places established in 1951
Populated places in Central District (Israel)
Yemeni-Jewish culture in Israel